Driver's Education ’99 is a 1998 video game developed by Dynamix.

Development
The game was originally scheduled to release in September 1998 The game was adopted for Utah high schools statewide.

Reception

Roy Bassave from New York Daily News gave the game a score of 3.5 out of 4 stating "But this program can ease jitters beginners have about getting on the highway - and it's great refresher for veteran drivers"

References

1998 video games
Driving simulators
Sierra Entertainment games
Dynamix games
Windows games
Windows-only games